Bandung Islamic University (abbreviated as UNISBA) is one of the oldest private universities in Indonesia based in Bandung, West Java. The purpose of UNISBA is to produce mujahid (leader), mujtahid (researchers) and mujaddid (pioneer) in an Islamic scientific society.

History 
In 1957, a number of West Java Muslim leaders along with some scholars who at that time became members of the Constitutional Assembly of Indonesia, initiated the cadre of leaders of the faqih fiddin for the future. On November 15, 1958, the idea was realized through the establishment of the Perguruan Islam Tinggi (PIT), under the Islamic Education Foundation with the Notary Deed of Lie Kwie Nio, number: 42. The founders listed on the Notarial deed are: Prof. Sjafie Soemardja, dr. H. Chasan Boesoiri, Drs. Ahmad Sadali, Oja Somantri, R. Kosasih, R. Sabri Gandanegara, and Dadang Hermawan.
The college is intended to meet the needs of the people of West Java, especially for a higher Islamic college in the midst of various college styles at that time. The establishment of this college was fully supported by the people of West Java through members of the West Java Province legislative assembly.

Initially, lectures were held at the Muslimin Building, Jalan PalasariNo. 1, Bandung. A year later, in 1960, academic activities were transferred to Jalan Abdul Muis. 73 Bandung. In 1967, Perguruan Islam Tinggi (PIT) changed to Bandung Islamic University (UNISBA) led by prof. T. M. Soelaeman, M.Sc., EE. Since 1972, all university activities have been held at the Blue Campus, at Jalan Tamansari no. 1 Bandung, on a land area of 10,808 m2, provided by the Municipal Government of Bandung.

With assistance from Muslims, semi-permanent buildings were built for lecture halls, offices, libraries, academic facilities, Mosque, and multipurpose hall. Due to the increasing number of students and more academic programs, in 1980, the Campus II was built in Ciburial Dago, approximately 7 km from Tamansari Campus. The Campus II was built using a donation from H. Amir Machmud (Minister of Home Affairs at that time).

Since 1987, all academic and student activities have been centered on the Tamansari Campus, while Campus II  is used for student boarding activities, scientific meetings, upgrading and training.

Academics

Admission and selectivity 
Admission to UNISBA is conducted through entrance examinations (PMB) and PMDK. Each year UNISBA accepts only about 25% of the 10,000 applicants.

Accreditation 
UNISBA obtained accreditation of rank A (Very Good) from the National University Accreditation Board of Higher Education (BAN PT). The accreditation of higher education institutions (AIPT) is obtained in 2017. The accreditation assessment includes 15 indicators covering leadership, student affairs, human resources, curriculum, infrastructure and facilities, funding, governance, management system, learning system, academic atmosphere, quality assurance systems, graduates, research and community service, and study programs.

Reputation 
Based on the Ministry of Research, Technology and Higher Education college ranking (2015), UNISBA ranked 32 out of 3320 universities in Indonesia. Mid-2017, UNISBA won the 1 st winner Internal Quality Assurance System (SPMI) in Indonesia from Ministry of Research, Technology and Higher Education. UNISBA also won the Best Regional University Award in Education Sphere from the Europe Business Assembly, which sells "fake awards".

UNISBA includes 100 Selection Campus KOMPAS (2017). National Survey of Data and Analysis TEMPO mentioned that UNISBA is one of the favorite Private Universities in Indonesia through 6 study programs namely Law, Communication, Medicine, Psychology, Management and Accounting. Faculty of Communication UNISBA 5 years in a row (2012-2016) to be ranked "Best School of Communication" version of  Mix Magazine. Faculty Dirasah (Shari/ah, Dakwah, Tarbiyah) UNISBA is the first rank in the category of the best Faculty of Islam in the environment Kopertais Region II West Java and Banten.

Undergraduate program 
The Islamic University of Bandung has 10 Faculties with 18 Study Programs and 4 Professional Programs:
 Faculty of Shari'ah
 Law of Sharia Economics
 Law of Islamic Family 
 Faculty of Tarbiyah
 Islamic education
 Early childhood education 
 Faculty of Dakwah
 Islamic Communications and Broadcasting
 Faculty of Law
 Law
 Faculty of Mathematics and Natural Sciences
 Statistics
 Mathematics
 Pharmacy
 Professional Pharmacist Program
 Faculty of Psychology
 Psychology
 Faculty of Economics and Business
 Management
 Accounting
 Economics
 Professional Accountant Program
 Faculty of Engineering
 Mining Engineering
 Industrial Engineering
 Urban and Regional Planning
 Professional Engineer Program
 Faculty of Communication
 Communication Studies
 Faculty of Medicine
 Medicine
 Professional Medical Program

Postgraduate program

Masters program 
Bandung Islamic University has eight Masters Study Programs:
 Master of Sharia Economics
 Concentration of Sharia Finance
 Concentration of Sharia Banking
 Concentration of Sharia Business Management
 Master of Islamic Education
 Concentration of Islamic Education
 Concentration of Early Childhood Education
 Concentration of Islamic Education Management
 Master of Law 
 Concentration of Islamic Law
 Concentration of Health Law
 Concentration of Criminal Law
 Concentration of Business Law
 Concentration of International Law
 Concentration of State Administration Law
 Master of Notary
 Master of Management
 Concentration of Hospital Management
 Concentration of Leadership Management
 Concentration of Entrepreneurship Management
 Concentration of Financial Management and Banking
 Concentration of Sharia Financial Management and Banking
 Master of Professional Psychology
 Concentration of Clinical Psychology
 Concentration of Educational Psychology
 Master of Communication Studies
 Concentration of Business Communication
 Concentration of Political Communication
 Concentration Communication Dakwah
 Master of Urban Studies and Planning
 Concentration of Town Planning Management
 Concentration of Regional and Rural Planning
 Concentration of Coastal and Marine / Maritime Planning

Doctoral program 
Bandung Islamic University has one Doctoral Program:

 Doctor of Law

Notable alumni 
Taslim Azis, Indonesian politician, pesilat, interim member of the People's Representative Council in 2019.
Cindy May McGuire, Indonesian medical doctor, actress, 2022 G20 Ambassador, beauty pageant titleholder who was crowned Puteri Indonesia Lingkungan 2022, Miss International 2022.
Ahmad Taufik, Indonesian newspaper journalist known for his articles critical of the dictatorship of President Suharto.
Mohammed Taufiq Johari, Malaysian politician.

References

External links
 Bandung Islamic University

Islamic universities and colleges in Indonesia
Universities in Bandung
1958 establishments in Indonesia
Educational institutions established in 1958